La Fille aux yeux d'or (English: The Girl With the Golden Eyes) is an 1835 novella by Honoré de Balzac. It is the third part of the Thirteen series, which includes the short stories Ferragus and La Duchesse de Langeais. It is also part of his La Comédie humaine novel sequence.

Synopsis
The story follows the decadent heir Henri de Marsay, who becomes enamored of the beautiful Paquita Valdes, and his plan to seduce her. He succeeds but becomes disillusioned when he discovers she is involved with another lover, and so he plots to murder her. When he arrives to kill her, he discovers that she is already dead by the hand of her lover, his half-sister. She declares that Paquita came from a land where women are no more than chattels, able to be bought and used in any way. In the last lines of the story, de Marsay tells a friend that the girl has died of "something to do with the chest,” by which he means tuberculosis.

Film
In 1961, a film was released based on the novel starring Marie Laforêt, Paul Guers, Françoise Prévost, Françoise Dorléac and Jacques Verlier. It was adapted by Philippe Dumarçay, screenwritten by Pierre Pelegri, and directed by Jean-Gabriel Albicocco.

See also
 Coppélia, a ballet

References

External links

E-text of the story
 
 

1835 French novels
Books of La Comédie humaine
Bisexuality-related fiction
French LGBT novels
Novellas by Honoré de Balzac
Novels with bisexual themes
Female bisexuality in fiction
French novels adapted into films